Cirilo Suárez González (born 18 March 1956) is a Cuban rower. He competed in the men's quadruple sculls event at the 1976 Summer Olympics.

References

1956 births
Living people
Cuban male rowers
Olympic rowers of Cuba
Rowers at the 1976 Summer Olympics
Place of birth missing (living people)